A Pan American Championship is a top level international sports competition between athletes or sports teams representing their respective countries or professional sports clubs in the Americas. Typically these championships are recurring, the most common formats being annual, biennial and quadrennial. The Pan American Games is the highest level sporting competition for the region. It is common for there to be sport-specific governing bodies to organise these regional competitions, such as the Pan American Judo Confederation.

Major tournaments

See also
 Pan American Games, a multi-sport event between competitors from all nations in the Americas
 Championship
 World championship
 African Championship
 Asian Championship
 Central American Championships (disambiguation)
 European Championship
 European Junior Championships (disambiguation)
 North American Championship
 Canadian Championships
 Oceania Championship
 South American Championship

 *